The 1979 Cork Senior Hurling Championship was the 91st staging of the Cork Senior Hurling Championship since its establishment by the Cork County Board in 1887. The championship began on 8 April 1979 and ended on 7 October 1979.

Blackrock entered the championship as the defending champions.

The final was played on 7 October 1979 at Páirc Uí Chaoimh in Cork, between Blackrock and St. Finbarr's, in what was their first meeting in the final in five years. Blackrock won the match by 2-14 to 2-06 to claim their 28th championship title overall, their second title in succession and their fifth of the decade.

Midleton's John Fenton was the championship's top scorer with 5-45.

Team changes

To Championship

Promoted from the Cork Intermediate Hurling Championship
 Midleton

Results

Division 1

Table

{| class="wikitable" style="text-align:center"
!width=20|
!width=150 style="text-align:left;"|Team
!width=20|
!width=20|
!width=20|
!width=20|
!width=30|
!width=30|
!width=20|
!width=20|
|- style="background:#ccffcc"
|1||align=left|St. Finbarr's ||3||2||1||0||7-41||6-20||+24||5
|- style="background:#ccffcc" 
|2||align=left|Blackrock ||3||2||0||1||8-36||2-36||+18||4
|- style="background:#FFFFE0" 
|3||align=left|Glen Rovers ||3||1||1||1||8-29||4-29||+12||3
|-
|4||align=left|Sarsfields ||3||0||0||3||4-21||15-42||-54||0
|-|align=left|
|colspan="10" style="border:0px"| Green background The two top-placed teams qualified for the semi-final stage of the championship proper.Yellow background The third-placed team qualified for the quarter-final stage of the championship proper.
|}

Results

Division 2

Table

{| class="wikitable" style="text-align:center"
!width=20|
!width=150 style="text-align:left;"|Team
!width=20|
!width=20|
!width=20|
!width=20|
!width=30|
!width=30|
!width=20|
!width=20|
|- style="background:#ccffcc" 
|1||align=left|Midleton ||5||4||1||0||13-65||13-49||+16||9
|- style="background:#ccffcc" 
|2||align=left|Youghal ||5||3||0||2||16-54||6-59||+25||6
|-
|3||align=left|University College Cork ||5||3||0||2||9-63||8-50||+16||6
|-
|4||align=left|Na Piarsaigh ||5||2||1||2||14-50||12-45||+11||5
|-  
|5||align=left|Nemo Rangers ||5||1||0||4||12-32||13-67||-38||2
|-  
|6||align=left|Bandon ||5||1||0||4||6-54||18-42||-24||2 
|-|align=left|
|colspan="10" style="border:0px"| Green background The two top-placed teams qualified for the quarter-final stage of the championship proper.
|}

Results

Play-off

Division 3

First round

Semi-finals

Final

Knock-out stage

Quarter-finals

Semi-finals

Final

Championship statistics

Top scorers

Top scorers overall

Top scorers in a single game

Miscellaneous

 Midleton return to the senior championship for the first time since 1964.

References

Cork Senior Hurling Championship
Cork Senior Hurling Championship